Mordellistena diversestrigosa is a beetle in the genus Mordellistena of the family Mordellidae. It was described in 1941 by Maurice Pic.

References

diversestrigosa
Beetles described in 1941